Cummins House is a historic house in Adelaide, situated at 19-23 Sheoak Avenue, Novar Gardens. It was listed on the South Australian Heritage Register on 24 July 1980.

History
On 15 May 1838, John Morphett used his preliminary land order to buy 134 acres of land bounded by Pine Avenue, Anzac Highway and Morphett Road, near the present Morphettville race course. On 13 January 1840, he was granted title to the land which he named "Cummins Estate" after his mother's Devonshire farm. He kept sheep and cows, planted fruit trees, vines and olive groves, and cultivated a variety of local and imported trees. A horse lover, he also kept a stud and was involved in racing. (He was one of the original directors of the Morphettville Racing Club, founded in 1847).

Morphett's home, Cummins House, was designed by architect George Kingston. It was sited on the Sturt River and begun in 1842 as a five roomed red brick cottage. It was extended considerably in 1854, and there were further extensions in 1906, 1945, 1977 and 1983.

The fourth generation owner, Hurtle Morphett, offered this residence and land for sale but a satisfactory purchaser was not forthcoming. To ensure that the home would be saved, the SA Government purchased the house on the remaining 1.68 acres in 1977. In 1982, Immanuel College leased Cummins from the State Government, with the aim of restoring the property for use as a pioneer museum, and as an exhibition and performance centre. The lease was for 5 years. With the assistance of the Cummins Society, the West Torrens Historical Society, and the National Trust, the school spent about $30,000 a year on the restoration of the house from an empty shell. At the end of the lease period, the State government offered the lease to the West Torrens Council, who agreed to take charge of the property "under certain conditions".

Subdivisions
In 1919, the first sub-division occurred when land south of the Holdfast Bay railway line was sold for a new subdivision for returned servicemen's homes. In 1921, the area, which also included that part of Cummins Estate where Cummins House is located, was renamed to Novar Gardens to honour Viscount Novar, (who as Sir Ronald Munro Ferguson was the sixth Governor-General of Australia from 1914 to 1920). Hence, Cummins House is located at 23 Sheoak Avenue, Novar Gardens, South Australia.

A large section of the property was purchased by Immanuel College in 1949.  The remaining 32 acres were held until 1963, when ~30 acres, often referred to as "Cummins Park", were sold for housing, leaving 1.68 acres containing the home and the outbuildings.

Timeline of Cummins House

References

Houses in Adelaide
South Australian Heritage Register